Calocybe indica, commonly known as the milky white mushroom, is a species of edible mushroom native to India. The sturdy all-white mushrooms appear in summer after rainfall in fields and on road verges. Traditionally eaten in West Bengal, it is being grown commercially in several Indian states and other tropical countries.

Taxonomy
Calocybe indica was formally described in 1974, from material collected in Calcutta. The authors—botanists R.P. Purkayastha and Aindrila Chandra—had noted it to be a popular mushroom in markets in West Bengal. They placed it in the section Calocybe of the genus Calocybe, noting that it appeared closely related to and was similar morphologically to Calocybe gambosa, from which it differed by having slightly larger oval spores, and a stouter mushroom. Botanist A. S. Krishnamoorthy found it growing in Tamil Nadu in the mid 1990s, and its commercial production was overhauled and improved.

Description
The robust mushroom is all-white in colour and has a firm consistency. The cuticle (skin) can be easily peeled off the cap. The mushroom does not change colour on cutting or bruising, though old dried specimens have a buff colour. The flesh has a mild flavour that has been described as oily, and a faint smell reminiscent of radishes it tastes like an unripened coconut that which we can eat it without any cooking. The spore print is white, and the oval spores measure 5.9–6.8 μm long by 4.2–5.1 μm wide.

Distribution, habitat and ecology
Calocybe indica grows in grasslands, fields and road verges in Tamil Nadu and Rajasthan, generally on substrate rich in organic material. The mushrooms appear between May and August after spells of rainfall. The fungus is saprophytic, though it has been reported to form ectomycorrhizal relationships with the roots of the coconut tree (Cocos nucifera), palmyra palm (Borassus flabellifer), tamarind (Tamarindus indica) and yellow poinciana (Peltophorum pterocarpum).

Cultivation
Calocybe indica is cultivated commercially in southern India and becoming more popular in China, Malaysia, and Singapore; it can be grown in hot humid (60% to 70%) countries with a temperature range of 25 to 35 °C year-round, It undergoes the two phases dark phase and the light phase where in dark phase the mycelium development will takes place and in the light phase the pin heads start growing. The entire process will take 65 days to get the complete milkywhite mushroom.

References

Fungi described in 1974
Fungi of India
Lyophyllaceae
Edible fungi